Théophile Junior N'Tamé N'Tamé (born 17 May 1985) is a Cameroonian former professional footballer who played who as a defender.

Career
N'Tamé started playing in France, in lower leagues clubs Marmande and FC Saint-Louis Neuweg. In 2006, he moved to Switzerland where he represented FC Alle. Next year, he moved to Belgian Second Division club Union Royale Namur. In summer 2008. he moved to Slovenia to play in Slovenian First League club Interblock Ljubljana where he played until January 2010, when he moved back to France, this time to play with Ligue 2 club Stade Brestois 29. At the end of the season Brest got promoted to Ligue 1. NTamé made his French top league debut on 18 December 2010 in a match of the 18 round against Nice, a 1–1 draw.

N'Tamé joined Wrexham on trial in early July 2013. He made his debut for Wrexham in a 1–1 draw against Blackburn Rovers in a pre-season friendly. After a successful trial period he signed a six-month contract with the club keeping him there until January 2014. He scored his first goal for the club on his home debut in a 2–2 draw with Hyde in the league. On 17 December 2013, it was announced that N'Tamé had cancelled his contract by mutual consent. He had made seven league appearances.

Honours
Interblock
 Slovenian Cup: 2008–09

External sources
 
 
 Stats from Slovenia at PrvaLiga.si.

References

Living people
1985 births
Cameroonian footballers
Cameroonian expatriate footballers
Association football defenders
Ligue 2 players
Ligue 1 players
Belgian Pro League players
FC Saint-Louis Neuweg players
FC Alle players
Union Royale Namur Fosses-La-Ville players
NK IB 1975 Ljubljana players
Stade Brestois 29 players
Wrexham A.F.C. players
Expatriate footballers in France
Expatriate footballers in Switzerland
Expatriate footballers in Slovenia
Expatriate footballers in Belgium
Expatriate footballers in England
Cameroonian expatriate sportspeople in France
Cameroonian expatriate sportspeople in Switzerland
Cameroonian expatriate sportspeople in Slovenia
Cameroonian expatriate sportspeople in Belgium
Cameroonian expatriate sportspeople in England